The former government of Alexei Kosygin was dissolved following the Soviet legislative election of 1970. Kosygin was once again elected Premier by the Politburo and the Central Committee following the election. His third government would last for four years, until the 1974 Soviet election.

Ministries

Committees

References 
General

Government of the Soviet Union > List
 

Specific

Soviet governments
1970 establishments in the Soviet Union
1974 disestablishments in the Soviet Union
Era of Stagnation